Bogradsky District (Khakas: , Bograd aymağı) is an administrative and municipal district (raion), one of the eight in the Republic of Khakassia, Russia. It is located in the northeast of the republic. Its administrative center is the rural locality (a selo) of Bograd. Population:  The population of Bograd accounts for 29.4% of the district's total population.

References

Notes

Sources

Districts of Khakassia